McKeegan is a surname. Notable people with the surname include:

Karl McKeegan (born 1978), Northern Irish hurler
Leonard McKeegan (born 1963), Irish hurler
Michael McKeegan (born 1971), Northern Irish musician
Tim McKeegan (1877–1939), Australian rules footballer

See also
5663 McKeegan, a main-belt asteroid